The Sunshine Coast Marathon is part of the 'Sunshine Coast marathon and community run festival' located on the Sunshine Coast of Queensland.  The festival also incorporates a full marathon, half marathon, 10k run, 5k run and a 2k fun run. It is an annual event held in August and was first run in 2012.
The marathon starts and ends at the 'Alexandra Headland Surf Life Saving Club'.  The picturesque route loops along Alexandra Headland, Mooloolaba & Maroochydore beachfronts.

The marathon course is IAAF-AIMS certified and accepted as a Boston Marathon qualifier.

Results
Race record in bold

See also

List of marathon races in Oceania

References

External links
Sunshine Coast Marathon
AIMS website
IAAF website

Marathons in Australia
Annual sporting events in Australia